Euryades corethrus is a species of butterfly from the family Papilionidae that is found in Brazil, Paraguay, Uruguay, and Argentina.

E. corethrus is a tailless swallowtail. The male is much paler than duponcheli and  semitransparent. The hind wing upperside has a band of yellow spots outside the red discal spots. The female is likewise paler than duponcheli, the margin more narrowly black and the very pale red submarginal spots of the hindwing large, the discal row on the contrary replaced by black spots, only the last black spot is always dotted with reddish grey (often also the first and sometimes the next two as well).

The larvae feed on Aristolochia sessilifolia, Aristolochia fimbriata, and other Aristolochia species.

References
Edwin Möhn, 2002 Schmetterlinge der Erde, Butterflies of the world Part XIIII (14), Papilionidae VIII: Baronia, Euryades, Protographium, Neographium, Eurytides. Edited by Erich Bauer and Thomas Frankenbach Keltern: Goecke & Evers; Canterbury: Hillside Books.  All species and subspecies are included, also most of the forms. Several females are shown the first time in colour.

Lewis, H. L., 1974 Butterflies of the World  Page 23, figure 8, female.
Grice, H., Nunez-Bustos, E., Mega, N., Dias, F.M.S., Rosa, A., Freitas, A.V.L. & Marini-Filho,O. 2019. Euryades corethrus (amended version of 2018 assessment). The IUCN Red List ofThreatened Species 2019: e.T160549A145166527. http://dx.doi.org/10.2305/IUCN.UK.2019-1.RLTS.T160549A145166527.en

External links
Butterfly Corner Images from Naturhistorisches Museum Wien

Butterflies described in 1836
Euryades
Papilionidae of South America
Taxa named by Jean Baptiste Boisduval